Strongylo (Greek: Στρογγυλό) may refer to several places in Greece:

Strongylo, Arcadia, a village in Arcadia
Strongylo (east Syros), a small island near the east coast of Syros in the Cyclades
Strongylo (south Syros), a small island near the southwest coast of Syros in the Cyclades
Strongylo (Fournoi), a small island near the south coast of Fournoi in the North Aegean
Strongylo (Arkoi), a small island near the west coast of Arkoi in the Dodecanese

See also
Strongyli (disambiguation)
Strongylos